From the Irrawaddy River basin in Yunnan, China, Devario interruptus is a small fish in the minnow family, very similar to Devario shanensis. The fish appears to grow to a maximum of 5 to 6 cm.

References

Devario
Fauna of Southeast Asia
Fish described in 1870